Bicci may refer to:

 Bicci di Lorenzo (1373-1452), Italian painter and sculptor, active in Florence
 Giovanni di Bicci de' Medici (c. 1360–1429), Italian banker and founder of the Medici Bank
 Lorenzo di Bicci (c. 1350–1427), Italian painter of the Florentine School 
 Neri di Bicci (1419-1491), Italian painter active mainly in Florence
 Yoko Kanno produce Cyber Bicci, a compilation album of Japanese composer Yoko Kanno and Italian vocalist Ilaria Graziano